Lang Leav (born September 8, 1980) is an international bestselling New Zealand novelist and poet. She is the author of Lullabies which won the Goodreads Choice Award in the category of Best Poetry (2014).

Early life

Leav was born at a refugee camp in Thailand where her parents were seeking refuge from the Khmer Rouge regime in Cambodia.

She is the youngest of three siblings. In 1981, her family migrated to Australia. Her mother worked as a seamstress whilst her father was an acupuncturist. Leav was raised in the refugee town of Cabramatta, Sydney.

Leav's interest in literature started at a young age. She would transcribe her poetry into books she made by hand, which she then passed around to her peers at school.

Education
Leav attended the College of Fine Arts in Sydney. The refugee community she belonged to was critical of her decision as the field was perceived as financially unstable and therefore impractical. Nevertheless, Leav persisted. Her undergraduate thesis in college, titled "Cosplaying Lolita" granted her a Churchill Fellowship Award.

Career
While Leav is known for being a writer, she initially established a cult fashion label Akina which earned her a Qantas Spirit of Youth Award. In 2012 Leav began posting her poetry on Tumblr and her work amassed a large following. In 2013 she self-published her first collection of poetry and prose titled Love and Misadventure. The book was a surprise hit and caught the attention of literary agents in New York. Leav signed with New York Agency, Writers House before she was offered a publishing deal with Andrews McMeel. The bestselling book ranked top on Amazon. Leav released Lullabies the following year which won the Goodreads Choice Award for Poetry.  Newsweek credits Leav for popularizing poetry.

Leav subsequently published another five poetry titles: Memories (2015) The Universe of Us, (2017) Sea of Strangers (2018) and Love Looks Pretty on You (2018), all of which were nominated for the Goodreads Choice Award for Poetry have been international bestsellers. Her debut novel Sad Girls reached #1 on the Straits Times Bestseller chart for fiction and drew mixed reviews. Bustle wrote, “Sad Girls will have you reaching for the tissues; this YA debut is incredibly powerful.”  The New Straits Times and The Star (Malaysia) criticized the novel for its lack of depth and character development.

Leav’s second novel, Poemsia was also a Straits Times Bestseller
and drew mainly positive reviews, with Marie Claire stating ‘Leav writes masterfully from the perspective of her protagonist, an aspiring poet, and gives readers a backstage glimpse into the new-wave poetry movement.'

Readings stated, “The writing is not as lyrical as one would have hoped from a poet, but the characters are well defined.”

Leav's college degree equipped her with the technical skills to illustrate several of her books, including Love & Misadventure, Lullabies, Memories and The Universe of Us.

Leav has been a guest speaker at a number of international writers festival including The Sydney Writers Festival, The Sharjah Book Fair and Auckland Writers Festival. She has toured extensively to the United States, Philippines, Singapore, Malaysia and the UAE often drawing large crowds at her book signing events.

In 2019, Penguin Random House secured the audio rights to Leav’s novel, Poemsia, in addition to her poetry titles including, The Universe of Us, Sea of Strangers and Love Looks Pretty on You.

Leav has just released her latest poetry title, September Love. The foreword is written by Lili Reinhart.

Style and inspiration
Leav's work is described by the New York Times as frank poems about love, sex, heartache and betrayal. 

She writes mainly in rhyme, verse and prose poetry. The tone of her work is confessional. Her poetry's accessibility gained her a mass following around the world.

Leav considers Emily Dickinson as her main inspiration. She admires Dickinson's ability to convey intense emotion in short and compact poems. She also cites Robert Frost as an influence,
for his use of colloquial language. The reoccurring themes of nature, love, death and time in Frost’s poems often appear in Leav’s own work.

Maryanne Moll, an award-winning Filipino fictionist and a literary criticism student, said Lang’s poems are her way of exercising the trauma she inherited from her mother. In an interview with Marc Fennel from SBS, Leav explains how her style of writing stems from being a natural translator for her immigrant parents. “Language had to be distilled as things can get lost in translation.” 

Leav is occasionally attributed to the Instapoetry movement 
 which has been panned by the literary establishment as being derivative.

Whether Leav’s work falls into this genre has been a subject of contention. Hotpress writes, ‘But if you compare Lang’s work to many of her contemporaries, you’ll notice she writes somewhat less like them and more in line with the work of classical poets.

Bibliography

Poetry and prose collection 
Love and Misadventure (2013)
Lullabies (2014)
Memories (2015)
The Universe of Us (2016)
Sea of Strangers (2018)
Love Looks Pretty on You (2019)
September Love (2020)
The Gift of Everything (2021)

Poetry 
Anthology of Love (2017)

Novels 
Sad Girls (2017)
Poemsia (2019)

See also
 Instapoetry

References

21st-century New Zealand poets
21st-century New Zealand women writers
1980 births
Instagram poets
Living people
New Zealand women poets